Abu Ali (also Romanized as Abū ‘Alī) is a village in Balyan Rural District, in the Central District of Kazerun County, Fars Province, Iran. At the 2006 census, its population was 1,627, in 299 families.

References 

Populated places in Kazerun County